Zieglerodina is an extinct conodont genus in the family Spathognathodontidae.

The generic name is a tribute to Willi Ziegler.

References

External links 

Ozarkodinida genera